Food Weekly News is a weekly food science and agricultural newspaper reporting on the latest developments in research in food production. It is published by Vertical News, an imprint of NewsRx, LLC.

External links
 
 Articles on HighBeam Research

Food science
Newspapers published in Atlanta
Agricultural magazines
Weekly newspapers published in the United States